Nine referendums were held in Switzerland during 1952. The first was held on 2 March on a federal resolution on changing the licensing requirements for new pubs, and was rejected by 54% of voters. The second was held on 30 March on a federal law on promoting agriculture and the farming community, and was approved by 54% of voters. The third was held on 20 April on a popular initiative on a "commodity sales tax", and was rejected by 81% of voters. The fourth was held on 18 May on a popular initiative "for the finance of armaments and the protection of social achievements", and was rejected by 56% of voters. The fifth was held on 6 July on a federal resolution on the coverage of expenditure on weapons, and was rejected by 58% of voters. The sixth and seventh were both held on 5 October on making an amendment to the federal law on Aged and Bereavement insurance regarding tobacco tax, and on establishing air raid shelters in buildings. The first was approved by 68% of voters, whilst the second was rejected by 85%. The eighth and ninth were both held on 23 November on a limited prolongation of some price controls and a federal resolution on bread supply. Both were approved by voters.

Results

March: Changes to licensing for new pubs

March: Federal law on promoting agriculture

April: Commodity sales tax

May: Popular initiatives on armaments and social achievements

July: Weapons expenditure

October: Aged and bereavement insurance

October: Air raid shelters

November: Price controls

November: Bread supply

References

1952 referendums
1952 in Switzerland
Referendums in Switzerland